Macdonald River may refer to:

Macdonald River (Bendemeer), New South Wales, Australia
Macdonald River (St Albans), New South Wales, Australia
MacDonald River (Métabetchouane River), Quebec, Canada
MacDonald River (Côte-Nord), Quebec, Canada

See also 
 Macdonald (disambiguation)